Thomas Flournoy Foster (November 23, 1790 – September 14, 1848) was an American politician and lawyer.

Foster was born in Greensboro, Georgia. He attended Franklin College, the founding college of the University of Georgia in Athens, and graduated in 1812 with a Bachelor of Arts (A.B.) degree. He studied at the Litchfield Law School, gained admittance to the state bar in 1816 and became a practicing attorney in Greensboro.

Foster was elected to the Georgia House of Representatives in 1822 and was reelected through 1825. In 1828, he won election to the 23rd United States Congress as a Jacksonian and served two additional terms before losing his reelection bid in 1834. He moved to Columbus, Georgia, the following year. In 1840, he returned to the U.S. House as a Whig in the 27th Congress. He only served one term in that position. He died in Columbus on September 14, 1848, and was buried in that city's Linwood Cemetery.

References

History of the University of Georgia, Thomas Walter Reed,  Imprint:  Athens, Georgia : University of Georgia, ca. 1949 p.156

External links

1790 births
1848 deaths
People from Greensboro, Georgia
American people of English descent
Jacksonian members of the United States House of Representatives from Georgia (U.S. state)
Whig Party members of the United States House of Representatives from Georgia (U.S. state)
Members of the Georgia House of Representatives
American slave owners
Georgia (U.S. state) lawyers
University of Georgia alumni
Litchfield Law School alumni